Kathryn "Kathy"  Ruemmler (born April 19, 1971) is an attorney who formerly served as Principal Deputy White House Counsel and then White House Counsel to President Barack Obama. Previously a partner at Latham and Watkins co-chairing its white-collar defense group, Ruemmler joined Goldman Sachs in 2020 as a Partner and Global Head of Regulatory Affairs. In 2021, she was promoted to Chief Legal Officer and General Counsel.

Early life and education
A graduate of Richland High School in Richland, Washington, Ruemmler received a Bachelor of Arts in English from the University of Washington, and earned her Juris Doctor from Georgetown University Law Center. She also served as Editor-in-Chief of the Georgetown Law Journal.

Career
Ruemmler is a former federal prosecutor who helped lead the government's case against the former executives of Enron.

Ruemmler clerked for Judge Timothy K. Lewis on the Third Circuit in 1996 and 1997
.
From 2000 to 2001 she served as Associate Counsel to President Clinton.
She worked as a federal prosecutor from 2001 to 2007, first as an Assistant United States Attorney in the District of Columbia, and finishing as a  deputy director of DOJ's Enron Task Force.
In 2006, she delivered the government's closing argument in the trial of former Enron executives Kenneth Lay and Jeffrey Skilling, both of whom were convicted.
She returned to Latham in Washington, D.C. in 2007, this time as a partner, but left in January 2009 to serve as principal associate deputy attorney general at the Justice Department. She served as White House Counsel from 2011–2014, and then again returned to Latham.

In 2020, Ruemmler joined Goldman Sachs as a partner.  She currently serves as Chief Legal Officer and General Counsel; she was previously Global Head of Regulatory Affairs.  She serves on the firmwide Management Committee.

White House Counsel
In October 2011, Ruemmler said that there is no evidence of the White House intervening in Solyndra's loan guarantee to benefit a campaign donor. Her letter to the House Energy and Commerce Committee also denies an effort by committee Republicans for access to internal White House communications. The letter goes on to deny Republican claims of improper White House influence in the Energy Department's 2009 decision to grant the company a $535 million loan guarantee, and the deal's early 2011 revamp that put private investors ahead of taxpayers for repayment if the company liquidated.

Over what would have traditionally been the 2011-2012 winter recess of the 112th Congress, the House of Representatives did not assent to recess, specifically to block Richard Cordray's appointment as Director of the Consumer Financial Protection Bureau. As a result, both the House and Senate held pro forma sessions. On January 4, 2012, President Obama claimed authority to appoint Richard Cordray and others under the Recess Appointments Clause. Counsel Ruemmler asserted that the appointments were valid, because the pro forma sessions were designed to, "through form, render a constitutional power of the executive obsolete," and that the Senate was for all intents and purposes recessed. Republicans in the Senate disputed the appointments, with Senate Minority Leader Mitch McConnell stating that Obama had "arrogantly circumvented the American people" and endangered "the Congress's role in providing a check on the excesses of the executive branch." It was expected that there would be a legal challenge to the appointments.

On January 6, 2012, the Department of Justice Office of Legal Counsel issued an opinion regarding recess appointments and pro forma sessions, stating that "[t]he convening of periodic pro forma sessions in which no business is to be conducted does not have the legal effect of interrupting an intrasession recess otherwise long enough to qualify as a "Recess of the Senate" under the Recess Appointments Clause. In this context, the President therefore has discretion to conclude that the Senate is unavailable to perform its advise-and-consent function and to exercise his power to make recess appointments."

After National Federation of Independent Business v. Sebelius was decided in favor of the Obama administration on 28 June 2012, Ruemmler was the one to tell Obama and his chief of staff, Jack Lew, that the administration's signature Obamacare legislation had actually been upheld.

In a profile by the Washington Post, it was reported that during negotiations over John Brennan's confirmation as CIA director, according to a White House official, it was Ruemmler who decided that the House and Senate intelligence panels could review the e-mails about different drafts of the Benghazi talking points without letting them take copies. The administration shifted course this month by releasing the e-mails after weeks of controversy over their content.

She announced plans that she would be stepping down as White House Counsel in mid May. She returned to private practice in July 2014.

In September 2014 when Attorney General Eric Holder announced his intention to step down, Ruemmler was speculated as being a potential candidate as the next United States Attorney General. She withdrew from consideration the following month, amid speculation that she would have faced a "difficult confirmation process" because of her close friendship with President Obama.

Personal life
Design firm Ashe Leandro created a line of furniture named after her, called "Ruemmler." She is a client of the firm, and the line contains piecemeal elements made of wood (often, French Oak), leather, silk, and steel.

See also
 Barack Obama Supreme Court candidates

References

External links

1971 births
20th-century American lawyers
21st-century American lawyers
American prosecutors
Georgetown University Law Center alumni
Living people
People from Richland, Washington
University of Washington College of Arts and Sciences alumni
Washington (state) lawyers
White House Counsels
20th-century American women lawyers
21st-century American women lawyers